Sergey Sergeyevich Verkashansky (born 6 September 1989) is a Russian professional football player.

Club career
He made his Russian Football National League debut for FC Volgar Astrakhan on 6 July 2014 in a game against FC Tyumen.

External links
 Career summary by sportbox.ru

1989 births
People from Krasnogvardeysky District, Belgorod Oblast
Living people
Russian footballers
Association football forwards
FC Chernomorets Novorossiysk players
FC Volgar Astrakhan players
FC Armavir players
FC Khimki players
FC Mashuk-KMV Pyatigorsk players
Sportspeople from Belgorod Oblast